Princess of the Dark is a 1917 American silent drama film directed by Charles Miller and starring Enid Bennett, John Gilbert, and Gayne Whitman.

Cast
 Enid Bennett as Fay Herron
 John Gilbert as 'Crip' Halloran 
 Gayne Whitman as Jack Rockwell
 Walt Whitman as James Herron
 J. Frank Burke as Crip's Father

References

Bibliography
 John T. Soister, Henry Nicolella, Steve Joyce. American Silent Horror, Science Fiction and Fantasy Feature Films, 1913-1929. McFarland, 2014.

External links

 

1917 films
1917 drama films
1910s English-language films
American silent feature films
Silent American drama films
American black-and-white films
Triangle Film Corporation films
Films directed by Charles Miller
1910s American films